Arvell Nelson (born September 27, 1988) is an American football quarterback for the San Antonio Gunslingers of the National Arena League (NAL). He was signed by the Alabama Hammers as an undrafted free agent in 2012. He played college football at University of Iowa, before transferring to Fort Scott Community College and Texas Southern University.

Early life
Nelson attended Glenville High School in Cleveland, Ohio, where he was a quarterback for the Tarblooders football team. Nelson's quarterback play landed him scholarship opportunities at Iowa, Michigan State, North Carolina, Syracuse, Tennessee and Wisconsin.

College career

Iowa
Nelson choose to commit to the University of Iowa, where he redshirted during his freshman season. As a redshirt freshman in 2007, Nelson was given the opportunity to compete with Jake Christensen for the Hawkeyes starting quarterback spot, but Christensen won, and Nelson was named the team's backup quarterback. Nelson saw his first college playing time in the Hawkeyes second game of the season, a 35–0 victory over Syracuse. Nelson completed his only pass attempt for 12 yards. Nelson would later be moved to wide receiver, losing the backup quarterback position to Ricky Stanzi. Nelson was dismissed from the Hawkeyes football team by head coach Kirk Ferentz.

Fort Scott
In 2008, Nelson enrolled at Fort Scott Community College, where he joined the football team as a safety. Nelson also saw time playing quarterback, but his play at safety lead him to being named second team All-Kansas Jayhawk Community College Conference.

Texas Southern
Nelson choose to enroll at Texas Southern University in 2009, where he was named the starting quarterback for the Tigers. Nelson was named the Southwestern Athletic Conference Newcomer of the Year after finishing second in the conference in passing yards and passing touchdowns.
In 2010, Nelson returned as the starter for the Tigers, and lead them to a west division title. Nelson however missing the SWAC Championship Game due to an NCAA violation. The Tigers ended up winning the SWAC Championship Game without Nelson, The NCAA later revoked the teams championship due to a major sports violation.

Professional career
Nelson was rated the 51st best quarterback in the 2011 NFL Draft by NFLDraftScout.com.

Alabama Hammers
After going undrafted in the 2011 NFL Draft, Nelson signed with the Alabama Hammers of the Professional Indoor Football League (PIFL). Nelson was named the team's starting quarterback for the first eight games of the season, before being replaced by Tony Colston.

Spokane Shock
Nelson was assigned to the Spokane Shock of the Arena Football League (AFL) on November 8, 2012. Nelson was brought in to compete for playing time at quarterback, with former Shocker starter Kyle Rowley departing for the Orlando Predators. Nelson made the team as a backup to Erik Meyer. Nelson lined up at a multitude of positions for the Shock, making his debut as a quarterback, only to run the football. It wasn't until the Shock's Week 11 game against the San Jose SaberCats when Nelson attempted his first pass. Nelson finished the season with 5 touchdown passes on 16-of-20 attempts, while also getting 6 rushing touchdowns, and 4 receiving touchdowns.

The Shock picked up their rookie option on Nelson in September 2013.

Pittsburgh Power

On October 3, 2013, the Shock traded Nelson and Ben Ossai for Pittsburgh Power wide receiver Mike Washington. The Power folded in November 2014.

Spokane Shock
On January 5, 2015, Nelson was reassigned to the Shock. After spending the first 12 weeks of the season on the refused to report list, Nelson was activated on June 16, 2015.

Cleveland Gladiators
In March 2016, Nelson was assigned to the Cleveland Gladiators. He began the season at jack linebacker for the Gladiators but became the starting quarterback after injuries to Chris Dieker and Dennis Havrilla. He made his first start at quarterback for the team on April 29, 2016 after Havrilla was injured, throwing for 332 yards and six touchdowns in a 76–56 loss to the Orlando Predators. Nelson threw for 3,425 yards and 70 touchdowns in 2016. On March 25, 2017, Nelson was placed on recallable reassignment. Nelson was assigned to the Gladiators on April 12, 2017. Nelson made his first start of the season for the Gladiators on April 22, 2017. Nelson was the third different starting quarterback the Gladiators had used in three games.

Richmond Roughriders 
Nelson signed with the Richmond Roughriders of the American Arena League in April 2018.

Washington Valor
Nelson was assigned to the Washington Valor on May 29, 2018. He led the Valor to a 69–55 victory in ArenaBowl XXXI and was named the ArenaBowl Most Valuable Player.

San Antonio Gunslingers
On March 16, 2023, Nelson signed with the San Antonio Gunslingers of the National Arena League (NAL).

AFL statistics

Stats from ArenaFan:

References

External links

Arena Football League bio

1988 births
Living people
American football quarterbacks
American football linebackers
American football safeties
Iowa Hawkeyes football players
Fort Scott Greyhounds football players
Texas Southern Tigers football players
Alabama Hammers players
Spokane Shock players
Pittsburgh Power players
Cleveland Gladiators players
American Arena League players
Washington Valor players
Players of American football from Cleveland